Hsiao-Hung Pai is a London-based journalist and writer. Her book Chinese Whispers: The True Story Behind Britain's Hidden Army of Labour was short-listed for the 2009 Orwell Prize and her Scattered Sand:The Story of China's Rural Migrants won the Bread and Roses Award in 2013.

Hsiao-Hung has written for The Guardian, Open Democracy, Red Pepper, Feminist Review, Socialist Review, Chinese Times UK, Chinese Weekly, The Storm (as a columnist), and many other Chinese-language publications worldwide.

Background
Hsiao-Hung Pai was born in Taiwan.

Pai has lived in the UK since 1991, and holds master's degrees from the University of Wales, University of Durham and the University of Westminster.

Bibliography
Chinese Whispers: The True Story Behind Britain's Hidden Army of Labour (Penguin Books 2008) 
Scattered Sand: The Story of China's Rural Migrants (Verso Books, 2012) 
Invisible: Britain's Migrant Sex Workers (Westbourne Press, 2013) 
 Angry White People: Coming Face-to-face with the British Far Right (Zed Books March 2016)  
Bordered Lives: How Europe Fails Refugees and Migrants (New Internationalist, January 2018) 
Ciao Ousmane: The Hidden Exploitation of Italy's Migrant Workers (Hurst, January 2021)

References

External links
 https://www.hsiao-hung.com/
Hsiao Hung-Pai at The Guardian

1968 births
Living people
British investigative journalists
British non-fiction writers
Fu Jen Catholic University alumni
Writers from Taipei
Taiwanese emigrants to the United Kingdom
Taiwanese journalists
British women journalists
Taiwanese women journalists